Nawab Kumhar Inayat Kotia was a Punjabi singer, songwriter and composer from Kot Inayat Khan village situated in, Wazirabad Tehsil, Gujranwala District, Punjab, Pakistan. He wrote, directed and sang many famous Punjabi songs based on the folklore and heroic characters of Punjab. Nawab Kumhar's folk singing style left a strong impact on later folk singers who adopted his style of singing particularly his jugni singing style which was later adopted by next generation singers like Alam Lohar and made more famous among the next generations through Radio and TV singing platforms.

Early life 
Kumhar was taught the art of ballad singing by Allah Ditta Warriach from a neighbouring village. He became known at the age of 35 on Lahore Radio in 1933. His major contributions to Punjabi culture are Jugni, Sohni Mahiwal, Mirza Sahiban, Dhol Sammi, Sassi Punnu, Dulla Bhatti, Puran Bhagat, Jaimal Phatta etc. His sons Sarja and Mirza used to sing while his son Buta played jorri (alghoza). The prominent jorri player with them was Janna.

Legacy 
Kumhar's legacy lived on via his grandson (Sarjas son used to play the tumba and sing) but love for singing was carried on by his student and son-in-law Janna (not the jorri artist). Later Janna's sons carried on folk singing ballads and mahiyas. They are known as Rafiq Kumhar, Latif Kumhar and Haneef Kumhar Teddy. Haneef become famous by singing Chaudhary Mairaj din Dogars songs such as "Ghund chuk chuk vaikhan nawee viyahi da".

Works 

Puran bhagat (1933) Vol. 1 and 2 {Re-produced in Wasta Hai Rabb Da in 2000}
Jung Jaimal Fatta (1960)
Sohni da Husan (1961)
Dhol Shehzada Sammi (1974)
 Veer Jodh
 Mirza Sahiban
 Heer
 Jujugni
 Jattan nay laani Munji

References

Pakistani male singers
Punjabi people
Punjabi-language singers